Society Girl is a 1976 Pakistani drama film, directed by Sangeeta and written by Syed Noor. The film is produced by Raza Ali Rizvi, with music by Nazir Ali and film song lyrics by Tasleem Fazli. The film stars Sangeeta, Ghulam Mohiuddin, Kaveeta, Aslam Pervaiz, and Nisho. Sangeeta won a Special Nigar Award for directing this commercially successful film of 1976.

Cast
Sangeeta as Julie
Ghulam Mohiuddin as Asif
Kaveeta as Mona
Qavi Khan as Doctor 
Aslam Pervaiz as Seth
Bahar Begum as Mummy
Nisho as Shakeela
Saqi
Ibrahim Nafees

Soundtrack 
The film music was composed by Nazir Ali:
 Tum Jaisi Bhi Ho – Mehdi Hassan
 Tere Qadmon Men Bikhar Jane (Happy) – Noor Jahan
 Happy Christmas To You – Nahid Akhtar & Others
 Andaz Wohi Apnaya Hay Teray Dil Ko Pasand Jo Aa Jaye - Akhtar

Reception 
Society Girl was a critical and commercial success. The success of the film established Sangeeta as one of the leading directors of Pakistani cinema.

Awards
Nigar Awards 
Special Award - Sangeeta
Best Supporting Actress - Kaveeta
Best Editing - A. Saeed

References

External links
 

1976 films
Films directed by Sangeeta (Pakistani actress)
1970s Urdu-language films
1976 directorial debut films
Nigar Award winners
Films about prostitution
Films about cancer
Pakistani romantic drama films
Interfaith romance films
Urdu-language Pakistani films